The Dean of Windsor is the spiritual head of the canons of St George's Chapel at Windsor Castle, England. The dean chairs meetings of the Chapter of Canons as primus inter pares. The post of Dean of Wolverhampton was assimilated to the deanery of Windsor, around 1480, until 1846.

List of deans

Late medieval
1348 John de la Chambre
1349 William Mugge
1381 Walter Almaly
1389 Thomas Butiller
1402 Richard Kingston
1419 John Arundel
1454 Thomas Manning
1461 John Faulkes (Vaux)
1471 William Morland
1471 John Davyson
1473 William Dudley
1476 Peter Courtenay
1478 Richard Beauchamp
1481 Thomas Danett
1483 William Beverley
1485 John Davyson
1485 John Morgan
1496 Christopher Urswick

Early modern
1505 Christopher Bainbridge
1507 Thomas Hobbs
1509 Nicholas West

1515 John Vesey [alias Harman]
1519 John Clerk
1523 Richard Sampson
1536 William Franklyn
1553 Owen Oglethorpe
1556 Hugh Weston
1558 John Boxall (deprived)
1560 George Carew
1572 William Day
1596 Robert Bennet
1603 Giles Thomson
1612 Anthony Maxey
1618 Marco Antonio de Dominis
1622 Henry Beaumont
1627 Matthew Wren
1635 Christopher Wren
1659 Edward Hyde [not installed]
1660 Bruno Ryves
1677 John Durell
1683 Francis Turner
1684 Gregory Hascard
1709 Thomas Manningham
1709 John Robinson

1714 The Lord Willoughby de Broke
1729 Peniston Booth
1765 The Hon Frederick Keppel
1778 The Hon John Harley
1788 John Douglas
1791 The Hon James Cornwallis
1794 Charles Manners-Sutton

Late modern
1805–1816 Edward Legge
1816–1846 Henry Hobart
1846–1854 George Neville-Grenville
1854–1882 Gerald Wellesley
1882–1884 George Connor
1884–1891 Randall Davidson
1891–1917 Philip Eliot
1917–1944 Albert Baillie
1944–1962 Eric Hamilton
1962–1971 Robin Woods
1971–1976 Launcelot Fleming
1976–1989 Michael Mann
1989–1997 Patrick Mitchell
1998–present David Conner

See also

Dean and Canons of Windsor

References

Sources
Fasti Wyndesorienses: The deans and canons of Windsor. Historical monographs relating to St. George's Chapel, Windsor Castle Volume 8. Sidney Leslie Ollard (1950)
British History Online – A History of the County of Berkshire: Volume 2 – Deans of Windsor

 
Windsor Castle